The Barbados national rugby union team represents Barbados at the sport of rugby union. Barbados has been playing international rugby union since the mid-1990s. They have thus far not qualified for a Rugby World Cup. Barbados has also hosted the Caribbean Championship.

The national side is ranked 83rd in the world, as of 16 January 2023.

History
Rugby union had a long history in Barbados, though there was originally only the one team, called the Barbados Rugby Union. In 1995 the union affiliated to the International Rugby Board (IRB).

Barbados made their international debut against the British Virgin Islands in 1996. Barbados won the match 10 to nil thanks to the heroics of Aidan "Irish" Kelleher now considered amongst the greatest player Barbados has ever had represent their country. They played three games the following year; losing to the Bahamas, Bermuda and Martinique. They played Trinidad & Tobago in 1999, losing nil to 15.

In 2001 they played the Bahamas again, defeating them 18 to 25, though they lost to Bermuda in their following fixture. In 2005 Barbados began their campaign to qualify for the 2007 Rugby World Cup in France, in the Round 1a of the Americas group. Competing in the South Pool, and won all three of their fixtures, defeating Guyana, Trinidad and Tobago and St Lucia. Barbados finished at the top of their pool, sending them into a play-off match against the winner of the South Pool, the Bahamas.  Played in Trinidad, Barbados defeated the Bahamas 52 to three. This sent them through to Round 3b, where they would play in a pool with Canada and the USA. Barbados lost both of their games, exiting the World Cup qualifiers.

During the qualification for the 2011 World Cup, Barbados were eliminated after a heavy defeat by Trinidad and Tobago.

Current squad
Squad as current as 7 November 2015

Record

Overall

See also
 Sport in Barbados
 Rugby union in Barbados

References

External links
Rugby Barbados
Barbados Rugby Football Union (BRFU)
Barbados on IRB.com
Barbados on rugbydata.com

Rugby Union
Rugby union in Barbados
Caribbean national rugby union teams